The 3rd Utah Senate District is located in Salt Lake County and includes Utah House Districts 31, 33, 35, 37, 40, 43, 44 and 47. The current State Senator representing the 3rd district is Gene Davis. Davis was first elected to the Utah Senate in 1998, and won his most recent re-election in 2018 with 70% of the vote.

Previous Utah State Senators (District 3)

Election results

2006 General Election

See also
 Gene Davis
 Utah Democratic Party
 Utah Republican Party
 Utah Senate

References

External links
 Utah Senate District Profiles
 Official Biography of Gene Davis

03
Salt Lake County, Utah